Pomacea camena is a South American species of freshwater snail with gills and an operculum, an aquatic gastropod mollusc in the family Ampullariidae, the apple snails.

Distribution
P. camena is endemic to Venezuela, where it is found in a shallow stream near Lagunella, at an altitude of 8000 m.

References

camena
Molluscs of South America
Invertebrates of Venezuela
Freshwater snails
Gastropods described in 1949